Carroll L. Coburn (February 23, 1907 – April 10, 1975) was a Vermont farmer and politician who served as President of the Vermont State Senate.

Biography
Carroll Leander Coburn was born in East Montpelier, Vermont on February 23, 1907.  He was educated at Plainfield High School and Goddard Seminary, and received a Bachelor of Science degree from Tufts University in 1930.

A Republican, Coburn owned and operated Twin Elms Farm in East Montpelier and served in local offices, including school board member.

Coburn served in the Vermont House of Representatives from 1939 to 1943.

In 1942 Coburn was elected to the Vermont Senate.  He served three terms, 1943 to 1949, and was Senate President from 1947 to 1949.

Coburn was again elected to the Vermont House in 1948, and served one term, 1949 to 1951.

In 1949 Coburn sold his farm and joined the staff of the Vermont Employment Security Department, where he remained until his 1971 retirement.  During his tenure with VESD Coburn served as President of the Vermont State Employees Association.

Coburn died in Berlin, Vermont on April 10, 1975. He was buried at Plain-Mont Cemetery in East Montpelier.

References 

1907 births
1975 deaths
People from East Montpelier, Vermont
Tufts University alumni
Republican Party members of the Vermont House of Representatives
Republican Party Vermont state senators
Presidents pro tempore of the Vermont Senate
20th-century American politicians
Goddard College alumni
Farmers from Vermont